The Smiley Park Historic District is a residential neighborhood and historic district in southern Redlands, California. The neighborhood is centered on Smiley Park, which was named for benefactors Alfred and Albert Smiley and includes the A. K. Smiley Public Library. Development in the district began in 1887 as much of Southern California grew rapidly due to the expanding citrus industry. Through the turn of the century, new residents mainly built Victorian homes, either in the form of larger Queen Anne designs or as smaller cottages. The Classical Revival style became popular around 1900, and after 1908 most new homes had American Craftsman designs. Growth in the district stopped in 1913 after a freeze crippled Redlands' orange industry; development in the city did not fully resume until after World War I, and later homes were mainly built outside the district.

The district was added to the National Register of Historic Places on December 29, 1994.

References

Houses on the National Register of Historic Places in California
Colonial Revival architecture in California
Neoclassical architecture in California
American Craftsman architecture in California
National Register of Historic Places in San Bernardino County, California
History of Redlands, California
Houses in San Bernardino County, California
Historic districts on the National Register of Historic Places in California
Buildings and structures in Redlands, California